José Refugio Velasco Martínez was a Mexican Divisional general as well as a governor of several Mexican states. He enlisted in the Mexican army when he was 17 years old, where he carried out his entire military life without going through any military college, fully training in the field. He stood out in the Second French Intervention in Mexico, during the Porfiriato, and finally in the Mexican Revolution. He came to play the position of Secretary of War and Navy of Mexico and had a relevant role in the end of the dictatorship of Victoriano Huerta.

Earlier Years
José Refugio Velasco Martínez was born on July 4, 1849, in the city of Aguascalientes City, being baptized four days later in the parish church.

On May 25, 1866, at the age of 17, he joined the Mexican Army when, in reaction to the abuses committed against his family by the French leaders who occupied the country because they considered them supporters of Benito Juárez, he voluntarily enlisted to the column of the Chihuahua National Guard commanded by Colonel Pedro Yépez and, at that time, was near El Parral. The following year he joined the regular army, thus taking part in the Second French Intervention in Mexico pitting himself against the Second Mexican Empire. participated in the Siege of Queretaro under the orders of Mariano Escobedo. He also took part in the Battle of San Jacinto.

Life during the Porfiriato and the Mexican Revolution
From 1871 to 1906 he participated in the Yaqui Wars in Sonora with uprisings such as the Guerrillas of Tetabiate and later campaigns of the Yaqui Wars at the end of the so-called Paz de Ortíz in 1897. He directly participated in the fighting of Zamauaca, Cerro del Gallo, Agua Alta, Cerro de Chunamove, Cerro de Huamare, Cajón del Álamo, Llano de los Algodones and Cerro de Zamahuaca; and shootings at Realito de Cumuripa, Puerto de Vázquez, Cerro de Zamahuaca, Tinaja del Bacatete and Cerro de Bachomobampo.

In 1871 he was in the attack on the Citadel of Mexico and San Juan Epatlán, in the expedition from Mexico to the State of Hidalgo where he fought in Tenango and Tenguedó . He faced the rebels led by Colonel J. García de la Cadena in Zacatecas. He participated in an expedition to Oaxaca where he was in the fighting that took place in Tecomavaca, Los Cires,Tequila and Veracruz. He also participated in expeditions to the states of Puebla and Morelos where he participated in the fighting of San Pedro Coayuca, Rancho de Tlachinola, Jonatecatepe and San Juan Epatlán.

In the states of Chihuahua and Coahuila, he participated in the repression of the different uprisings and disturbances that occurred as well as persecuting groups of people living in Durango.

He was appointed Brigadier General by President Francisco I. Madero and named Velasco Military Chief of Veracruz and Military Commander of Mexico City until the imposition of Victoriano Huerta by the coup known as the Ten Tragic Days.

Velasco informed Huerta that he would not recognize him until he was officially appointed, which he did as soon as Congress recognized Victoriano Huerta as president of Mexico. On July 14, 1913, Huerta appointed him Governor and military Commander of the states of Mexico, San Luis Potosí and Coahuila on November 18 of that same year. He is appointed deputy in the XXVI Legislature and subsequently promoted to Divisional General and assigned as commander of the Nazas Division.

Second Battle of Torreón
The towns of Torreón and Gómez Palacio were in the hands of the Villista chiefs, Calixto Contreras and the Arrieta brothers. On December 9, 1913, Velasco attacked these squares by capturing them. After heavy fighting, the fight intensified on March 30 and 31. On April 2, Velasco's troops withdrew, giving victory to Francisco Villa in the so-called Second Battle of Torreón. Velasco went with his troops to San Pedro de las Colonias where Federal Army troops had been quartered. He arrived on April 5 and reorganized the combat preparations. The meeting took place on Tuesday, April 14, 1914, where General Villa defeated Velasco's troops.

While Velasco was on his way to Torreón, Victoriano Huerta ordered Juan Andreu Almazán to be shot but Velasco opposed to it, preventing his execution.

Later, Pancho Villa would exhort Velasco not to surrender the Plaza de México to Álvaro Obregón and to unite his troops with his, offering him support with the division of his command to fight together against the Carrancistas, Obregonistas and against the invading Americans.

Secretary of War and Navy
On May 16, 1914, José Velasco was appointed governor of San Luis Potosí. On July 15, Victoriano Huerta resigned as president and Francisco S. Carvajal was appointed as interim president, who appointed José Velasco as Secretary of War and Navy. On July 24, he expelled Victoriano Huerta from the country but refused to leave Mexico.

Treaties of Teoloyucan
The United States threatened to take over Mexico City with the troops already occupying the port of Veracruz, General Velasco opts, after talks with Alfredo Robles Domínguez, to dissolve the Federal Army thus avoiding direct confrontation with the United States. To do this, he edited two manifestos, one to the army and the other to the nation, which materialized in the Teoloyucan Treaties signed on August 13, 1914, where the stipulated physical delivery of the federal corporations was authorized, signed by General Álvaro Obregón giving passed to the Constitutionalist Army led by Venustiano Carranza, ending the Huerta Regime.

On August 15, 1914, before the First Chief of the Constitutionalist Army, Venustiano Carranza entered the city, he left the Federal District after meeting with General Álvaro Obregón and met in Veracruz with General Jesús Carranza to let him know that he had fulfilled the pact. Carranza requests information from the Federal District and Venustiano Carranza states in writing on August 21 that

Even so, José Refugio Velasco went into exile to the United States.

On February 8, 1919, in a very delicate state of health, he returned to Mexico and settled in Mexico City where he died at dawn on March 27, 1919, being buried the next day in the Panteón Francés de la Piedad and later his remains were deposited in a crypt in the Metropolitan Cathedral.

References

Bibliography
 Velasco, El Último General del Ejército Federal José Antonio Velasco Lomelí, 2009, Casa Editorial Contreras.

1849 births
1919 deaths
People of the Mexican Revolution
Porfiriato
People from Aguascalientes City
Second French intervention in Mexico
Governors of San Luis Potosí
Governors of the State of Mexico
Governors of Coahuila
Politicians from Aguascalientes
20th-century Mexican politicians
19th-century Mexican military personnel
20th-century Mexican military personnel
Military personnel from Aguascalientes